The Eyrie Vineyards is an American winery in Oregon that consists of  in five different vineyards in the Dundee Hills AVA of the Willamette Valley.  In 1965, against the advice of his viticultural professors at the University of California, Davis, David Lett moved to Oregon to plant Pinot noir in the Willamette Valley. David and Diana Lett produced the first Pinot noir in the Willamette Valley, and the first Pinot gris in the United States.  Their first vintage in 1970.

The 1975 Eyrie Vineyards Reserve Pinot Noir placed in top ten among Pinot noirs in blind tasting at the Wine Olympics in 1979.

Burgundy winemaker Robert Drouhin organized a re-match at Maison Joseph Drouhin in France. The 1975 Eyrie Vineyards Reserve came in second, losing to Drouhin's 1959 Chambolle-Musigny by only two-tenths of a point. Drouhin later purchased land in Oregon and built Domaine Drouhin Oregon.

Over the years, David Lett (known locally as "Papa Pinot") maintained a light-handed style of Pinot noir that did not follow the trend toward greater flavor, tannin, and color extraction, believing color not to be an indicator of quality in Pinot noir. This put him at odds with some of the wine critics.
David Lett died on October 9, 2008. David and Diana's son Jason Lett is now president and winemaker for the winery.

The Eyrie Vineyards estate vineyards are part of the sub-American Viticultural Area (AVA) of Willamette Valley AVA known as the Dundee Hills. The winery itself is in McMinnville, which annually hosts the International Pinot Noir Celebration on the last weekend in July on the campus of Linfield College.

See also
 List of Oregon wineries and vineyards

References

 
 

Footnotes

External links
 

Buildings and structures in Yamhill County, Oregon
Wineries in Oregon 
Willamette Valley
1965 establishments in Oregon
American companies established in 1965 
Food and drink companies established in 1965